Kota Batu may refer to:

Places 
 Kota Batu, Brunei, historical area in Bandar Seri Begawan, Brunei
 Batu, East Java, city in East Java, Indonesia
 Cotabato City, city in Maguindanao, Philippines

Subdivisions 
 Kota Batu, Brunei-Muara, mukim in Brunei-Muara District, Brunei
 Cotabato, province of Philippines